Norman Stanley Glockson (June 15, 1894 – August 5, 1955) was a Major League Baseball catcher and National Football League guard

He also played in one game for the Racine Legion football team in 1922.

External links

Football stats from Pro-Football-Reference

Cincinnati Reds players
1894 births
1955 deaths
Baseball players from Illinois
Racine Legion players
Players of American football from Illinois
Newport News Shipbuilders players
Rockford Rox players
Rock Island Islanders players
Minor league baseball managers
Sportspeople from Maywood, Illinois